Choveys, also rendered as Joveyz, Joveys, and Joveyzeh, may refer to:
 Choveys 1
 Choveys 2
 Choveys 3